Werner Eplinius (1907-1957) was a German screenwriter.

Selected filmography
 Gasparone (1937)
 Maria Ilona (1939)
 The Immortal Heart (1939)
 Die goldene Stadt (1942)
 Melusine (1944)
 King for One Night (1950)
 Once on the Rhine (1952)
 Homesick for Germany (1954)
 Music in the Blood (1955)
 The Tour Guide of Lisbon (1956)
 The Beautiful Master (1956)
 My Brother Joshua (1956)
 Just Once a Great Lady (1957)
 The Winemaker of Langenlois (1957)
 The Big Chance (1957)

References

Bibliography 
 Noack, Frank. Veit Harlan: The Life and Work of a Nazi Filmmaker. University Press of Kentucky, 2016.

External links 
 

German male screenwriters
People from Potsdam
1907 births
1957 deaths
Film people from Brandenburg
20th-century German screenwriters